Monique Pelletier (born July 12, 1969) is an American former alpine skier who competed in the 1992 Winter Olympics and 1994 Winter Olympics.

World Cup results
Top 10

References

External links
 

1969 births
Living people
American female alpine skiers
Olympic alpine skiers of the United States
Alpine skiers at the 1992 Winter Olympics
Alpine skiers at the 1994 Winter Olympics
Sportspeople from Aspen, Colorado
21st-century American women